SEC Storied is a sports-documentary franchise, from the creators of the ESPN series 30 for 30, focusing on the people, teams, moments and events that tell the ongoing story of the Southeastern Conference.

Background
SEC Storied, from the creators of 30 for 30, debuted in September 2011, allowing viewers to see stories relating to the Southeastern Conference throughout its history. From recent moments to the past, legendary coaches and athletes are highlighted, as well as the greatest moments in SEC history. One of the most watched documentaries in ESPN history is SEC Storied film, The Book of Manning, profiling the Manning family.

In 2015, SEC Storied film It’s Time: The Story of Brad Gaines and Chucky Mullins received two Sports Emmy nominations for Outstanding Sports Documentary and Outstanding Music Composition/Direction/Lyrics, the first two Sports Emmy nominations for SEC Storied.

List of SEC Storied films
Unless otherwise noted, the following films are all approximately 50 minutes in length (not including commercials).

See also
30 for 30

References

External links
 Official website

Southeastern Conference
Sports in the Southern United States
Documentary television series about sports
ESPN.com
ESPN original programming
2011 American television series debuts
2010s American documentary television series
2020s American documentary television series
Documentary films about women's association football
Documentary films about association football